Amblyomma albolimbatum is a species of tick. It is also known as the stumptailed lizard tick. It feeds on lizards, in particular skinks, but also snakes. It is endemic to Australia.

References

alibolimbatum
Arachnids of Australia
Endemic fauna of Australia
Animals described in 1907